Cicouro is a former parish in the municipality of Miranda do Douro, Portugal. The population in 2011 was 95, in an area of 14.51 km2. In 2013, the parish merged with Constantim to form the new parish Constantim e Cicouro.

References

Former parishes of Miranda do Douro
Populated places disestablished in 2013
2013 disestablishments in Portugal